The 1966 Wichita Shockers football team was an American football team that represented Wichita State University as a member of the Missouri Valley Conference during the 1966 NCAA University Division football season. In its second season under head coach George Karras, the team compiled a 2–8 record (1–3 against conference opponents), tied for last place in the MVC, and was outscored by a total of 314 to 119. The team played its home games at Veterans Field, now known as Cessna Stadium.

Schedule

References

Wichita State
Wichita State Shockers football seasons
Wichita State Shockers football